Wind power in Germany is a growing industry. The installed capacity was 55.6 gigawatts (GW) at the end of 2017, with 5.2 GW from offshore installations. In 2019, a quarter of the country's total electricity was generated using wind power, compared to an estimated 9.3% in 2010.

More than 26,772 wind turbines were located in the German federal area by year end 2015, and the country has plans for further expansion. As of the end of 2015, Germany was the third largest producer of wind power in the world by installations, behind China and the USA. Germany also has a number of turbine manufacturers, like Enercon, Nordex and Senvion.

In the first half of 2021, with 22% a contribution to German electric generation, wind was the second most important contributor, following coal, which was the top producer, with 27%. In 2020 wind was the top generator.

Onshore wind power
Since 1995, onshore wind energy has been an important and major industry in Germany. 
In 1995, the gross production of onshore wind power was 1,530 GWh. By 2019, gross production from onshore wind power was over 101,000 GWh, allowing Germany to power about a fifth of the country from wind.
Larger onshore installations are in the works, which could possibly see a larger percentage of wind energy powering Germany. Germany is also notable for having some major wind turbine manufacturers based there, such as Enercon in Aurich, Senvion in Hamburg, and Nordex in Rostock.

Offshore wind power

Offshore wind energy also has great potential in Germany. Wind speed at sea is 70 to 100% higher than onshore and much more constant. As of 2007, a new generation of 5 MW or larger wind turbines which are capable of making full use of the potential of wind power at sea had been developed. This made it possible to operate offshore wind farms in a cost-effective way.

On 15 July 2009, the first offshore German windturbine completed construction. This turbine is the first of a total of 12 wind turbines for the alpha ventus offshore wind farm in the North Sea.

Following the 2011 Japanese nuclear accidents, Germany's federal government began work on a new plan for increasing renewable energy commercialization, with a particular focus on offshore wind farms. Under the plan, large wind turbines were to be erected far away from the coastlines, where the wind blows more consistently than it does on land, and where the enormous turbines won't bother the inhabitants. The plan aimed to decrease Germany's dependence on energy derived from coal and nuclear power plants.
The German government wanted to see 7.6 GW installed by 2020 and as much as 26 GW by 2030.

A major challenge was the lack of sufficient network capacities for transmitting the power generated in the North Sea to the large industrial consumers in southern Germany.

In 2014 410 turbines with 1747 megawatts were added to Germany's offshore windparks. Due to not yet finished grid-connections, only turbines with combined 528.9 megawatts were added to the grid feed at the end of 2014. Despite this, the gigawatt offshore windpower barrier was reportedly breached by Germany around the end of 2014 During 2015 offshore windpower was tripled to over 3 gigawatts capacity, signalling the growing importance of this sector.

At the end of 2019, Germany had installed 1,469 offshore wind turbines with a total capacity of 7.52 GW. Capacity in the North Sea reached 6.44 GW, capacity in the Baltic Sea reached 1.08 GW. In total, 25.8 TWh of power were produced in German offshore wind parks in 2019.

Government support
Since 2011, Germany's federal government has been working on a new plan for increasing renewable energy commercialization, with a particular focus on offshore wind farms.

In 2016, Germany decided to replace feed-in tariffs with auctions from 2017, citing the mature nature of the windpower market being best served in this way. These auctions have resulted in some future offshore wind farms to be operated at market prices and receive no subsidy.

Energy transition

The 2010 "Energiewende" policy has been embraced by the German federal government and has resulted in a huge expansion of renewables, particularly wind power. Germany's share of renewables has increased from around 5% in 1999 to 17% in 2010, reaching close to the OECD average of 18% usage of renewables.  Producers have been guaranteed a fixed feed-in tariff for 20 years, guaranteeing a fixed income. Energy co-operatives have been created, and efforts were made to decentralize control and profits. The large energy companies have a disproportionately small share of the renewables market. Nuclear power plants were closed, and the existing 9 plants will close earlier than necessary, in 2022.

The reduction of reliance on nuclear plants has so far had the consequence of increased reliance on fossil fuels and on electricity imports from France. However, in good wind Germany exports to France; in January 2015 the average price was €29/MWh in Germany, and €39/MWh in France. One factor that has inhibited efficient employment of new renewable energy has been the lack of an accompanying investment in power infrastructure (SüdLink) to bring the power to market. The transmission constraint sometimes causes Germany to pay Danish wind power to stop producing; in October/November 2015 this amounted to 96 GWh costing 1.8 million euros.
 
The  German states have varying attitudes to the construction of new power lines. Industry has had their rates frozen and so the increased costs of the Energiewende have been passed on to consumers, who have had rising electricity bills. Germans in 2013 had some of the highest electricity costs in Europe.

Public opinion

In Germany, hundreds of thousands of people have invested in citizens' wind farms across the country and thousands of small and medium-sized enterprises are running successful businesses in a new sector that in 2015 employed 142,900 people and generated 12.3 percent of Germany's electricity in 2016.

However, more recently, there has been increasing local resistance to the expansion of wind power in Germany, due to its impact on the landscape, incidences of removal of forests to build wind turbines, the emission of low frequency noise, and the negative impact on wildlife, such as birds of prey and bats.

Repowering
Repowering, the replacement of first-generation wind turbines with modern multi-megawatt machines, is occurring in Germany.  Modern turbines make better use of available wind energy and so more wind power can come from the same area of land.   Modern turbines also offer much better grid integration since they use a connection method similar to conventional power plants.

Statistics

Installed wind power capacity and generation in recent years is shown in the tables below:

Total

Offshore only

By State

See also

Renewable energy in Germany
Solar power in Germany
Geothermal power in Germany
Wind power in the European Union
Renewable energy by country

References

External links

Germany Inaugurates 5 MW Wind Turbine Prototype
5-MW BARD Near-shore Wind Turbine Erected in Germany
Deutsche Energie-Agentur (Dena), German Energy Agency
Official site about wind power and renewable Energy in the Emscher-Lippe-Region
Cost-optimal expansion of renewables would save Germany up to two billion euros a year

 

de:Windenergie#Deutschland